The 1997–98 English Hockey League season took place from October 1997 until May 1998.

The Men's National League was won by Cannock with the Women's National League going to Slough.

The Men's Hockey Association Cup was won by Cannock and the Women's Cup (AEWHA Cup) was won by Clifton.

Men's National League Premier Division League Standings

Women's National League Premier Division League Standings

Men's Cup (Hockey Association Cup)

Quarter-finals

Semi-finals

Final 
(Held at the National Hockey Stadium (Milton Keynes) on 5 April)

Cannock
Jimi Lewis, Paul Edwards, Andrew Humphrey, Craig Parnham, Michael Johnson, Kalbir Takher, Justin Pidcock, Ben Sharpe, Chris Mayer, Bobby Crutchley, Ian Hughes-Rowlands subs Simon Organ, John Mills, Will Glover, Gareth Terrett
Beeston
Danny Williams, Richard Stamp, Steven Wood, Keith Reesby, Andrew Seagar, Ashley Garratt, Craig Keegan, Andrew West, Paul Sheardown, Iain Randall, Mike Huckle subs Jeff Longden, Phil Sully, James McBlane

Women's Cup (AEWHA Cup)

Quarter-finals

Semi-finals

Final 
(Held at National Hockey Stadium (Milton Keynes) on 10 May)

Clifton
Claire Burr, Sue Brimble; J Martin, Michelle Robertson, J Scullion, Tammy Miller (capt), Lorraine Marsden, Louise Hipkins; Lucy Culliford, Denise Marston-Smith, Juliet Rayden. sub Elaine Basterfield 
Slough
Sue Knight, Lisa Copeland, Mandy Pottow, Michelle Hall, Ashleigh Wallace, Lucy Cope, Sue Chandler (capt), Alison Burd, Julie Robertson, Lesley Hobley, Helen Thornalley sub C Cummins, K Brannigan

References 

1997
field hockey
field hockey
1998 in field hockey
1997 in field hockey